The 2016–17 Central African Republic League season is the top level of football competition in Central African Republic.

Teams
A total of 12 teams participate in the Ligue de Bangui Première Division.

 1.Olympique Réal	 	  27pts [C]
 2.AS Tempête Mocaf	 	  18
 3.Espérance du 5ème	  17
 4.Réal Comboni		  16
 5.SCAF			  15
 6.Anges de Fatima		  15
 7.Anégrée Freese		  15
 8.FC SOS de Gbangouma	  15
 9.DFC8			  13
10.Castel Foot	          [P]

11.Sica Sport		  11
12.Aset de Gobongo	  	  9 [P]

References

Football leagues in the Central African Republic
League
League
Central African Republic